Tumor-associated calcium signal transducer 2, also known as Trop-2 and as epithelial glycoprotein-1 antigen (EGP-1), is a protein that in humans is encoded by the TACSTD2 gene.

This intronless gene encodes a carcinoma-associated antigen defined by the monoclonal antibody GA733. This antigen is a member of a family including at least two type I membrane proteins. It transduces an intracellular calcium signal and acts as a cell surface receptor.

Mutations of this gene result in gelatinous drop-like corneal dystrophy, an autosomal recessive disorder characterized by severe corneal amyloidosis leading to blindness.

Trop-2 expression was originally described in trophoblasts (placenta) and fetal tissues (e.g., lung). Later, its expression was also described in the normal stratified squamous epithelium of the skin, uterine cervix, esophagus, and tonsillar crypts.

Trop-2 plays a role in tumor progression by actively interacting with several key molecular signaling pathways traditionally associated with cancer development and progression. Aberrant overexpression of Trop-2 has been described in several solid cancers, such as colorectal, renal, lung, and breast cancers. Trop-2 expression has also been described in some rare and aggressive malignancies, e.g., salivary duct, anaplastic thyroid, uterine/ovarian, and neuroendocrine prostate cancers.

This antigen is the target of sacituzumab govitecan, an antibody-drug conjugate.

References

Further reading